Away village is located in Pokaran Tehsil of Jaisalmer district in Rajasthan, India. It is situated 90km away from sub-district headquarter Pokaran and 200km away from district headquarter Jaisalmer. 

The total geographical area of village is 11481 hectares. Away has a total population of 2,213 people. There are about 371 houses in Away village. Pokaran is nearest town to Away which is approximately 90km away.

Villages in Jaisalmer district